Svetlana Vadimovna Korytova  (born 24 March 1968) is a Russian volleyball player, who was a member of the national team that won the gold medal at the 1988 Summer Olympics.

References 
 Profile at sports-reference.com

1968 births
Living people
Sportspeople from Yekaterinburg
Volleyball players at the 1988 Summer Olympics
Volleyball players at the 1992 Summer Olympics
Olympic volleyball players of the Soviet Union
Olympic volleyball players of the Unified Team
Olympic silver medalists for the Unified Team
Olympic gold medalists for the Soviet Union
Russian women's volleyball players
Soviet women's volleyball players
Olympic medalists in volleyball
Medalists at the 1992 Summer Olympics
Medalists at the 1988 Summer Olympics
Honoured Masters of Sport of the USSR